Vareh Now is a village in Balghelu Rural District, in the Central District of Ardabil County, Ardabil Province, Iran. At the 2006 census, its population was 19, in 5 families.

References 

Towns and villages in Ardabil County